Minnehaha Grange, No. 398 was organized on December 23, 1873, with members from Edina Mills, Richfield Mills, St. Louis Park, and Hopkins.  The National Grange of the Order of Patrons of Husbandry, commonly known as the Grange, is an organization dedicated to the principles of "progressive agriculture" for the "social fraternity of the farmers".  The organization was founded in 1867 by Oliver Hudson Kelley in Elk River, Sherburne County, Minnesota and quickly spread across the country.  The fraternity tackled issues such as railroad prices, and providing education to farmers.

The Grange Hall was moved to Tupa Park near Minnesota State Highway 100 and Eden Avenue in Edina, Minnesota from its original location at the southeast corner of Wooddale Avenue and West 50th Street.

The building also served as Edina Village Hall from 1888 to 1942.

A Grange presence returned to the historic hall with the creation of the Oliver Hudson Kelley Grange (OHK), No. 834 in 2012 by a group of young historians and activists who refused to see the Grange disappear from the rich tapestry of Minnesota culture. OHK meets weekly at the historic Minnehaha Grange Hall in Edina and is the home of four Past State Masters and dozens of historic and current State Grange of Minnesota (SGMN) leaders. OHK Grange still opens in traditional, 150 year-old Grange tradition every business meeting, and is a proud and loud voice for progressive activism in Minnesota.

The Minnehaha Hall is owned by the Edina Historical Society along with the adjacent Cahill School, which are open for tour by appointment.

See also
 List of Grange Hall buildings
 National Register of Historic Places listings in Hennepin County, Minnesota

References

External links
Oliver Hudson Kelley (OHK) Grange, No. 834
Edina Historical Society -  Cahill School and Minnehaha Grange Hall No. 398

Buildings and structures in Edina, Minnesota
Clubhouses on the National Register of Historic Places in Minnesota
Cultural infrastructure completed in 1879
Grange buildings on the National Register of Historic Places
Grange organizations and buildings in Minnesota
Museums in Hennepin County, Minnesota
National Register of Historic Places in Hennepin County, Minnesota
1879 establishments in Minnesota